Charles J. Catrillo (August 13, 1945 – February 19, 2004) was an American Republican Party politician who served in the New Jersey General Assembly from the 32nd Legislative District from 1986 to 1988.

Born in Jersey City, Catrillo graduated from St. Peter's Preparatory School, Seton Hall University and Seton Hall University School of Law.

As the Assembly considered a bill that would allow the state to takeover school districts, Catrillo argued that the Jersey City Public Schools, which he cited as a "patronage mill" that poorly serves handicapped students, should be among the first to be taken over.

References

1945 births
2004 deaths
New Jersey lawyers
Republican Party members of the New Jersey General Assembly
Politicians from Jersey City, New Jersey
Seton Hall University School of Law alumni
St. Peter's Preparatory School alumni
20th-century American politicians
20th-century American lawyers